The Hongqi H5 is a Compact executive car manufactured by the Chinese manufacturer FAW under the luxury Hongqi marque from 2017. It was positioned under the Hongqi H7 full-size luxury car. The second generation Hongqi H5 was unveiled in 2022 with updated design language shared with the Hongqi H9 flagship. 


First generation

The first generation Hongqi H5 was originally reviewed as a preproduction concept during the 2017 Shanghai Auto Show, the production Hongqi H5 mid-size sedan debuted on the 2017 Guangzhou Auto Show. The Hongqi H5 is based on the same platform as the third generation Mazda 6 (GJ/GL), which is known as Mazda Atenza (produced by FAW-Mazda joint venture) in the Chinese market.

Powertrain

The prices range from 145,800 to 190,800 yuan.

Hongqi H5 Sports

The Hongqi H5 Sports is the sports appearance package for the Hongqi H5. It features more aggressive front and rear bumpers, reworked grille, glossy black trim parts and boot-mounted spoiler, and quad exhaust tips. However, the powertrain remains to be the same as the regular H5.

Second generation

Media images of the second generation Hongqi H5 were released in March 2022. The second generation model features a completely redesigned exterior in the same style of the Hongqi H9 flagship.

References

External links

Official website

H5
Front-wheel-drive vehicles
Mid-size cars
Sedans
Cars introduced in 2018
Cars of China